Gwalior International Cricket Stadium is a new under construction international cricket stadium at Shankarpur village in Gwalior West by the Madhya Pradesh Cricket Association. The proposed stadium will be built on a land of 30 acres, which has been taken over by Gwalior Division Cricket Association under the supervision of cricketer and fast bowler Raja Naney from Malviya Nagar. The construction of the proposed stadium is expected to be completed in 2022. It will have a seating capacity of around 50,000 spectators. It will also be equipped with flood lights for night matches, a swimming pool, sauna bath, modern gym, dressing room, and 30 corporate boxes.

See also

 Captain Roop Singh Stadium
 Mahadji Scindia Sports Complex

References

Buildings and structures in Gwalior
Cricket grounds in Madhya Pradesh
Sports venues in Madhya Pradesh
Sports venues in Gwalior
Proposed sports venues in India
Proposed stadiums